Sir Whitmore Acton, 4th Baronet (c. 1677 – 17 January 1731/32) was a British Member of Parliament.

He was the eldest son of Sir Edward Acton, 3rd Baronet and educated at St Edmund Hall, Oxford and the Middle Temple. He succeeded to the baronetcy upon the death of his father in 1716.

Acton lived at Aldenham Park, near Bridgnorth and held the office of High Sheriff of Shropshire for 1727–28.

He married Lady Elizabeth Gibbon, daughter of Matthew Gibbon of Putney, Surrey and had the following children:
Sir Richard Acton, 5th Baronet (1 January 1712 – 20 November 1791)
Elizabeth Acton (b. bef. 1730)
Jane Acton (b. bef. 1732)
Mary Acton (b. bef. 1732)

References

1670s births
1731 deaths
Alumni of St Edmund Hall, Oxford
Members of the Middle Temple
Baronets in the Baronetage of England
Members of the Parliament of Great Britain for English constituencies
British MPs 1710–1713
High Sheriffs of Shropshire
Acton family